Paralicornia limatula is a species of bryozoan, found near the island of Mauritius.

References 

Cheilostomatida